Socialist Republican Party of Ceará was a far-left socialist political party in the Ceará, Brazil. The party was founded on 2 January 1934. It was led by Moacin Caminha.

The party contested the 14 October 1934 elections to the Federal Chamber and the Ceará Constituent Assembly. The party nominated one candidate for the federal election and 10 candidates for the state assembly. None of its candidates were elected.

References 

Defunct political parties in Brazil
Socialist parties in Brazil
Political parties established in 1934
1934 establishments in Brazil
Political parties disestablished in 1934
1934 disestablishments in Brazil
Left-wing politics in Brazil
Far-left politics in Brazil